The 1920 Württemberg state election was held on 6 June 1920 to elect the 101 members of the Landtag of the Free People's State of Württemberg.

Results

References 

Wurttemburg
1920
June 1920 events